Butler Island is the name of two islands:

 Butler Island (Antarctica)
 Butler Island (Georgia), United States